Gorod 312 ("City 312") is a Russian-language band from Kyrgyzstan, formed in 2001. In the beginning of their career the band's name was "Mangra," but then they changed it to "Gorod 312." 312 is the area code of Bishkek, the city in Kyrgyzstan they came from. The band became famous in 2005, the year they released their first album  ("213 roads"). The name of this album is the band's name spelled backwards.

In 2006, they released their next album  ("Out of Range");

In 2007, they released their following album  ("Turn Back");

From 2009-2010, they toured in USA, Belgium, Poland, Germany, France, Netherlands.

In 2010, they filmed first in Russia 3D clip for a song "" ("Help Me").

Among others, Gorod 312 won two Golden Gramophone Awards for their songs.

The band supported the 2022 Russian invasion of Ukraine, and the Presidential Administration of Russia put it on the list of singers who were recommended to be invited to state-sponsored events.

Band Members 

 Ая (Aya) – Светлана Назаренко (Svetlana Nazarenko)
 Дим (Dim) – Дмитрий Притула (Dmitriy Pritula)
 Маша (Masha) – Мария Илеева (Mariya Ileyeva)
 Леон (Leon) – Леонид Притула (Leonid Pritula)
 Ник (Nik) – Леонид Никонов (Leonid Nikonov)
 Alex (Alex) – Александр Ильчук (Aleksander Il'ichuk)

Discography

Albums 

 213 Дорог (213 Dorog) – (2005)
 Вне зоны доступа (Vne zony dostupa) – (2006)
 Обернись (Obernis') – (2007)
 Live – (2008)
 Новая музыка – (2010)

Singles 

 Останусь (Ostanus')
 Вне зоны доступа (Vne Zony Dostupa)

References

Kyrgyzstani rock music groups
Pop music groups
Musical groups established in 2001
Winners of the Golden Gramophone Award